Stadion kraj Bistrice, also known as Gradski stadion Nikšić, is a multi-purpose stadium in Nikšić, Montenegro. It is currently used mostly for football matches and is the home ground of FK Sutjeska and a host of Montenegro national under-21 football team matches. The stadium had a total of 5,214 seats before the addition of a new west stand in 2020.

History
Football grounds in Nikšić existed before World War II. However, the first football stadium in the town was constructed in 1945. Over time, the stadium was renovated. During the 1960s, there were stands surrounding the entire stadium, giving it a capacity of approximately 15,000.

After 2000, there was a new renovation of the stadium. In 2001, the old south and north stands were torn down, and a new east stand was built, so the capacity of stadium was reduced to 10,800. After the Montenegrin independence, following the UEFA rules, the stadium capacity is reduced to 5,214 seats. Floodlights were installed in 2015, although they were first used on 7 August 2016, in a match between Sutjeska and Lovćen.

On 29 March 2019, representatives of Nikšić, Montenegro's Committee of Public Works and football association all signed a contract for the reconstruction of the stadium's west stand. The new stand will have approximately 3,200 seats when completed by the end of 2022.

Pitch
The pitch measures 105 x 70 meters. Between stands and pitch, there is an athletic track.

Tenants

During its history, the Stadium Kraj Bistrice was used by FK Sutjeska. Also, many Montenegrin clubs played in Nikšić their matches in European competitions. At their biggest matches in the First League, FK Čelik used Stadium Kraj Bistrice.

It is host stadium for the Montenegro national under-21 football team, too.

Highest attendances
Notable matches played at the Stadium Kraj Bistrice include:

Before 2006
FK Sutjeska - NK Trešnjevka Zagreb 0:0 (first match in First League, 16 August 1964) - att: 7,000
FK Sutjeska - FK Partizan Belgrade 2:2 (First League, 28 May 1967) - att: 15,000 
FK Sutjeska - FK Budućnost Podgorica 1:3 (Second League, 1 May 1975) - att: 12,000
FK Sutjeska - NK Hajduk Split 1:3 (Second League, 19 May 1985) - att: 15,000

After 2006
FK Sutjeska - FK Čelik Nikšić 1:0 (First League playoffs, 28 May 2008) - att: 8,000
FK Čelik Nikšić - FK Sutjeska 0:0 (First League playoffs, 1 June 2008) - att: 9,000
FK Sutjeska - FK Budućnost Podgorica 1:3 (First League, 25 May 2013) - att: 7,000
FK Sutjeska - FC Sheriff /Moldova/ 0:5 (UEFA Champions League, 23 July 2013) - att: 6,000

See also
FK Sutjeska Nikšić 
Nikšić 
Montenegrin First League
Montenegrin Derby

References 

Football venues in Montenegro
Football venues in Serbia and Montenegro
Athletics (track and field) venues in Serbia and Montenegro
Football venues in Yugoslavia
Athletics (track and field) venues in Yugoslavia
Multi-purpose stadiums in Montenegro
FK Sutjeska Nikšić